McGorian is a surname. Notable people with the surname include:

Elizabeth McGorian, Zimbabwean ballerina
Ike McGorian (1901–?), English footballer

See also
McGorman